The Korn Ferry Tour is the developmental tour for the U.S.-based PGA Tour, and features professional golfers who have either not yet reached the PGA Tour, or who have done so but then failed to win enough FedEx Cup points to stay at that level. Those who are on the top 25 of the money list at year's end are given PGA Tour memberships for the next season. Since the 2013 season, the Korn Ferry Tour has been the primary pathway for those seeking to earn their PGA Tour card. Q-School, which had previously been the primary route for qualification to the PGA Tour, has been converted as an entryway to the Korn Ferry Tour.

History
Announced in early 1989 by PGA Tour commissioner Deane Beman, the "satellite tour" was formalized by the PGA Tour in 1990, originally named the Ben Hogan Tour, sponsored by the Ben Hogan Golf Company. The first season of 1990 had 30 events, and the typical event purse was $100,000. Late in 1992, Nike acquired the title sponsorship and it became the Nike Tour for seven seasons (1993–1999). Buy.com was the next title sponsor with the tour being titled the Buy.com Tour for three seasons (2000–2002).

Nationwide Insurance became the tour's next title sponsors for the start of the 2003 season, with the tour being renamed the Nationwide Tour.  After  seasons as the Nationwide Tour, Web.com was announced as the new title sponsor in late June 2012. The 10-year sponsorship deal was effective immediately, and the tour's name was changed to the Web.com Tour mid-season. In June 2019, the PGA Tour announced a 10-year deal with Los Angeles-based consulting firm Korn Ferry to replace Web.com as the tour's sponsor.

The vast majority of tournaments have always been hosted within the mainland United States. In 1993 the tour reached beyond those boundaries for the first time, with the Monterrey Open in Mexico. It was an annual fixture on the tour schedule until 2001. The following season, the tour added PGA Tour of Australasia co-sanctioned events in Australia and New Zealand, and the Canadian PGA Championship in Canada. A tournament in Panama was added in 2004, and the tour returned to Mexico in 2008. The tour has also visited Colombia (since 2010), Chile (2012–2015), Brazil (2013–2016), the Dominican Republic (2016–2017) and the Bahamas (since 2017).

Rules and results
All Korn Ferry Tour tournaments operate similarly to typical PGA Tour tournaments in that they are all 72-hole stroke play events with a cut made after 36 holes. The cut on the Korn Ferry Tour is for the top 65 players and ties, unlike 70 for the PGA Tour. The fields are usually 144 or 156 players, depending on time of year (and available daylight hours). As with the PGA Tour, the winner of the tournament will get a prize of 18% of the total purse.

Since this tour is a developmental tour, players are usually vying to play well enough to gain status on the PGA Tour.

Until 2012, there were a number of ways of getting onto the Korn Ferry Tour: Top 50 golfers at qualifying school after the top 25 and ties, those who finished between 26th and 60th on the previous year's money list, 126–150th on the previous season's PGA Tour money list, and those who were formerly fully exempt on the PGA Tour in the recent past. Those without status can also earn enough to exceed 100th on the previous season's money list and earned unlimited exemptions for the remainder of the season. Around 14 open qualifying spots are given during the Monday of tournament week, and those who finished in the top 25 of a Korn Ferry event are automatically exempt into the next tournament. If a Monday morning qualifier wins an event, they will earn full-exempt status for the remainder of the season. Past PGA Tour winners aged 48 and 49 can play on the Korn Ferry Tour on an increased basis to prepare themselves for PGA Tour Champions, while former PGA Tour winners with limited status use the Korn Ferry Tour as a way to get back to the main tour.

In 2007 Paul Claxton became the first man to reach US$1 million in Korn Ferry Tour career earnings.

The Korn Ferry Tour offers Official World Golf Ranking points. The winner earns a minimum of 14 OWGR points (provided at least 54 holes are played) and 20 for the Korn Ferry Tour Championship. Starting in 2013, the other events of the Korn Ferry Tour Finals award 16 OWGR points to the winner. Tournaments shortened to 36 holes are given reduced values of ten points for regular season events and the win is considered unofficial.

Three-win promotion

Since 1997, a player who wins three tournaments in one year on the Korn Ferry Tour receives an immediate promotion to the PGA Tour for the remainder of the year and for the following year. This "performance promotion" (sometimes informally referred to as a "battlefield promotion") has occurred twelve times:

 1997:  Chris Smith
 2001:  Heath Slocum,  Chad Campbell,  Pat Bates
 2002:  Patrick Moore
 2003:  Tom Carter
 2005:  Jason Gore
 2007:  Nick Flanagan
 2009:  Michael Sim
 2014:  Carlos Ortiz
 2016:  Wesley Bryan
 2020–21:  Mito Pereira

Changes for 2013 season and beyond
On March 20, 2012, the PGA Tour announced radical changes to the main tour's season and qualifying process effective in 2013. Major changes to what was then known as the Nationwide Tour were also announced at that time. Full details of these changes were announced on July 10 of that year.

The first major change was that beginning in fall 2013, the PGA Tour season started in October of the previous calendar year. This change had several consequences for the Korn Ferry Tour, either directly or indirectly.

Starting with the 2013 season, the Korn Ferry Tour has a structure similar to that of the main PGA Tour, with a regular season followed by a season-ending series of tournaments. In the case of the Korn Ferry Tour, the ending series consists of four tournaments, to be held during the main tour's FedEx Cup playoffs, called the Korn Ferry Tour Finals. At least 150 players will be eligible to compete in the Finals—the top 75 on the Korn Ferry Tour regular-season money list, plus the players finishing between 126 and 200 on the FedEx Cup points list. Non-members of the PGA Tour are also eligible if they would have earned enough FedEx Cup points to finish 126 to 200. In addition, PGA Tour players who have been granted medical extensions for the following season are eligible. Because some of the PGA Tour players will be exempt by other means, such as tournament wins in the previous two years, the Finals fields will not consist of all eligible players. A total of 50 PGA Tour cards for the following season will be awarded at the end of the Finals—25 to the top regular-season money winners on the Korn Ferry Tour, with the remaining 25 determined by total money earned during the Finals.

Those who finish in the Top 75 on the regular season money list but fail to earn PGA Tour cards retain full Korn Ferry Tour status, along with those 26–50 on the Finals money list and those who finished 126–150 on the PGA Tour FedEx Cup standings. Conditional status is given to those who finish in the top 100 on the money list or 151–200 in the FedEx Cup.

Also, starting in 2013, the PGA Tour Qualifying Tournament was replaced by the Korn Ferry Tour Qualifying Tournament which grants playing rights only for the Korn Ferry Tour. The medalist is fully exempt on the Korn Ferry Tour for the entire season. Those finishing in the top ten plus ties are exempt through the third reshuffle, or thirteen events. Players finishing 11th-45th are exempt through the second reshuffle after nine events and all remaining golfers have conditional status. One can also earn direct access to the Korn Ferry Tour through a top-five finish on the Order of Merit on PGA Tour Canada, PGA Tour Latinoamérica, or PGA Tour China. The money leader from each of those tours is fully exempt and those 2nd-5th are conditionally exempt.

Finally, the Korn Ferry Tour now provides up to two entrants in the following year's Players Championship. One invitation is extended to the player who tops the money list for the entire season, including the Finals. The golfer who earns the most during the Finals also receives an invitation; if the same player leads both money lists, only one invitation is given.

Career money leaders
The table shows top-10 career money leaders on the Korn Ferry Tour as of the 2022 season. Players in bold were 2022 Korn Ferry Tour members.

There is a full list on the PGA Tour's website here.

Money list winners

Awards

See also
 Minor league
 List of golfers with most Korn Ferry Tour wins
 Professional golf tours
 Challenge Tour – the analogous tour in Europe operated by the PGA European Tour
 Epson Tour – the analogous tour in North American women's golf, operated by the LPGA

Notes and references

External links

 
1990 establishments in Florida
Professional sports leagues in the United States